Jeff Siegel is an American financial writer, publisher and musician.  He is the author of the bestseller Investing in Renewable Energy: Making Money on Green Chip Stocks along with Nick Hodge and Chris Nelder and is credited with coining the phrase "Green Chip Stocks".

Biography 
Siegel is from Baltimore, Maryland, and attended York College of Pennsylvania, where he was a regular commentator for WVYC and a founding member of the Pennsylvania Rho chapter of Phi Kappa Psi.

Financial writer 
Siegel is most notable for his expertise in the field of renewable energy and cannabis and psychedelics investing. Siegel founded and runs the private investment community, Green Chip Stocks, and is partner in the JLS Fund, which is a fund focused on psychedelics and plant-based medicine.  Siegel has made numerous appearances on shows like the Willis Report, Neil Cavuto CNBC Asia's Capital Connection, Squawk Box and Forbes on Fox.

Music career 
Siegel was an early member of Dog Fashion Disco, a founding member of The Alter Boys, and has worked on scoring several films including the prequel to the Exorcist, Exorcist: The Beginning.  He also appeared on MTV Europe, in the 2008 documentaries Working Class Rock Star, DFDVD, DFDVD II, The City is Alive Tonight and was featured on Farmclub.com.  Siegel performed at the Jagermeister Music Tour and the Warped Tour, and was interviewed for Kerrang!.  Siegel also lent his voice to The Warriors video game, published by Rockstar Games.

Books 
 Investing in Renewable Energy: Making Money on Green Chip Stocks. John Wiley & Sons. 2007. .
 Energy Investing for Dummies. John Wiley & Sons. 2013. .

References

Year of birth missing (living people)
Living people
American financial writers
American consultants
Musicians from Baltimore
American publishers (people)
Sustainability advocates
People associated with solar power
People associated with wind power